A variscale is variable length mechanical scale (ruler) designed to directly measure latitude and longitude on USGS maps.

References

External links
Instructions for using the Variscale

Measuring instruments
Cartography